François Tavenas,  (12 September 1942 – 13 February 2004) was a Canadian engineer and academic.

Born in Bourg-de-Péage, Drôme, France, he received an engineering degree in civil engineering from Institut national des sciences appliquées de Lyon in 1963 and a doctorate with specialization in soil mechanics in 1965 from the Université de Grenoble. In 1968, he moved to Canada to become a lecturer in the Department of Civil Engineering at Université Laval. A Canadian citizen since 15 July 1971, he became an assistant professor in 1970, an associate professor in 1973, and a professor in 1978. He was the dean, Faculty of Science and Engineering from 1985 to 1989.

From 1989 to 1990, he was the vice-principal (Planning and Computing) at McGill University. From 1990 to 1997, he was the Vice-Principal (Planning and Resources) at McGill University. From 1995 to 1997, he was the acting vice-principal (Macdonald Campus). As well, he was a professor in the Department of Civil Engineering and Applied Mechanics. In 1997, he was appointed the rector of Université Laval and a professor in the Department of Civil Engineering and in 2003 left to become the founding rector of the Université du Luxembourg.

Honours
1991 Elected as a fellow of the Engineering Institute of Canada.
1999 Made a chevalier of the French Legion of Honor.
2002 Awarded the Commander's Cross (Komturkreuz) of the Order of Merit of the Federal Republic of Germany.
2004 Made an officer of the National Order of Quebec.

References
 
 

1942 births
2004 deaths
People from Drôme
Canadian academics in engineering
Canadian university and college vice-presidents
French Quebecers
Commanders Crosses of the Order of Merit of the Federal Republic of Germany
Academic staff of McGill University
Officers of the National Order of Quebec
Fellows of the Engineering Institute of Canada
Academic staff of Université Laval
Rectors of Université Laval
Academic staff of the University of Luxembourg
Chevaliers of the Légion d'honneur